The Wharncliffe Charity Cup was an invitational cup competition organised by the Sheffield & Hallamshire County Football Association from 1878 to 1984.  

The competition took its name from the Earl of Wharncliffe, who sponsored the event, and was held with the aim of raising money for local good causes.

Finals

Winners

See also
 Sheffield & Hallamshire County Cup
 Sheffield & Hallamshire County Senior League
 Sheffield & Hallamshire Senior Cup

References

Sport in Sheffield
Football cup competitions in England
Defunct football competitions in South Yorkshire